The East Indian Defence is a chess opening characterised by the moves:
1. d4 Nf6
2. Nf3 g6

Description
This opening has a close kinship to the more-common King's Indian Defence and is often considered a variant thereof. The difference is that White has not yet played c4, and therefore retains some options.

If White plays an early c4, the opening will transpose into a King's Indian. It is also possible for White to support an early e4 advance, transposing into the Pirc Defence. Unless transposition is reached, there are four popular, independent continuations:
 3.g3, the Przepiórka Variation, closely related to the Fianchetto Variation of the King's Indian
 3.Bg5, a variant of the Torre Attack
 3.Bf4, the London System
 3.Nc3, the Barry Attack

The Encyclopaedia of Chess Openings classifies the East Indian Defence under A49 for the Przepiórka Variation and A48 for the others.

3.g3
Black almost always plays 3...Bg7. White can play 4.c4 or 4.Bg2.

After 4.Bg2, Black can play ...0-0, ...d5, or ...d6. 4...d5 gives the Neo-Grunfeld Defence with 5.c4 or 5.0-0 0-0 6.c4. 4...d6 is the same as 4...0-0 with 5.c4 0-0 or 5.0-0 0-0.

After 4...0-0, White can play 5.c4 or 5.0-0.

With move 5.0-0, Black can play ...d6 or ...d5. 5...d5 gives the Neo-Grunfeld Defence after 6.c4.

With move 5...d6, White will usually play 6.c4 for the Fianchetto Variation, but other moves are possible.

Example game
Vasily Smyslov vs. Gyula Sax, 1979 1.Nf3 Nf6 2.g3 g6 3.Bg2 Bg7 4.0-0 0-0 5.d4 d6 6.Nc3 Nbd7 7.e4 e5 8.dxe5 dxe5 9.b3 b6 10.a4 Bb7 11.Nd2 Re8 12.Ba3 Bf8 13.Bxf8 Nxf8 14.Nc4 Ne6 15.Re1 Qd4 16.Nd5 Kg7 17.Qf3 Bxd5 18.exd5 e4 19.Qd1 Nxd5 20.Bxe4 Rad8 21.Bxd5 Qxd5 22.Qxd5 Rxd5 23.Rad1 Red8 24.Rxd5 Rxd5 25.Kg2 Kf6 26.Ne3 Rd2 27.Ng4 Ke7 28.Ne3 Kd7 29.Rd1 Rxd1 30.Nxd1 Nd4 31.Ne3 Kd6 32.h4 Kc5 33.Kf1 Kb4 34.Ke1 Kc3 35.Kd1 c6 36.Kc1 Nf3 37.Nc4 f5 38.Nb2 f4 39.Nc4 Nd4 40.Ne5 fxg3 41.fxg3 c5 42.a5 Nxc2 43.axb6 axb6 44.Nd7 Nd4 45.Nxb6 Ne2 46.Kd1 Nxg3 47.Nd7 Kb4 48.Kc2 Nf5 49.Nf8 Nxh4 50.Nxh7 Nf5 51.Nf6 Nd4 52.Kd3 Kxb3 53.Nd7 Ne6 54.Ne5 g5

See also
 List of chess openings
 List of chess openings named after places

References 

Chess openings